Ganlu (甘露) may refer to:

Towns in China
Ganlu, Jiangxi, in Gongqingcheng, Jiangxi
Ganlu, Sichuan, in Zizhong County, Sichuan

Historical eras
Ganlu (53–50 BC), era name used by Emperor Xuan of Han
Ganlu (256–260), era name used by Cao Mao, emperor of Cao Wei
Ganlu (265–266), era name used by Sun Hao, emperor of Eastern Wu
Ganlu (359–364), era name used by Fu Jian (337–385), emperor of Former Qin

See also
Sweet Dew incident, or Ganlu incident, an 835 palace coup in the Tang dynasty
Amrita, which is translated into Chinese as Ganlu